Wayne Shillington (born 11 November 1966) is an Australian swimmer. He competed in the men's 1500 metre freestyle at the 1984 Summer Olympics.

References

External links
 

1966 births
Living people
Australian male freestyle swimmers
Olympic swimmers of Australia
Swimmers at the 1984 Summer Olympics
Place of birth missing (living people)